Kirill Preobrazhenskiy (born 1970 in Moscow, Soviet Union) is Russian artist, participant of Documenta 12. Works mainly with video and installations.

With his video and installations Kirill researches theory of media, semiotics and pop-culture and its relation to everyday reality. Being personally interested and involved in social spheres, from techno-culture to contemporary forms of political protests, Kirill addresses abstract ideas as if they were material and can be expressed aesthetically.

One of the pioneers of video art in Russia.

Biography 
From 1990 to 1993 took part in activities of group Van Gogh TV, for example in project Piazza Virtuale, at Documenta 9 in 1992. Was a part of Out-Governmental Control Commission 
Founded label VIDIOT. Now he is professor of New Media faculty in The Rodchenko Moscow School of Photography and Multimedia. Holds Cheremushki apartment gallery.

Selected exhibitions 
 1991 – "He" (with A. Belyaev). School Gallery, Moscow.
 1992 – "He" (with A. Belyaev). Museum of Paleontology, Moscow.
 1994 – "JU-87" (with A. Belyaev). Regina Gallery, Moscow.
 1994 – "Laboratory of frozen subsoil". Free Academy, Moscow
 1997 – "Platinum century. Fancy-dress party" (with A. Belyaev), Center of contemporary art, Moscow.
 2001 – "Subject and power. Lyrical voice", Art-Moscow, Moscow.
 2003 – "Plan  №9" (with A.Smirnsky), XL-gallery, Moscow
 2006 – "Love songs" (with S.Glushkova), Paperworks Gallery, Moscow
 2006 – "Re-action" (with Radek Community), Play-gallery for still and motion pictures, Berlin
 2002/07/09 – "ISM I, II, III" ("Incredible Strange Museum"), XL-gallery, Moscow; Central House of Artist, Moscow
 2007 – History of Russian Videoart. Vol.1, Moscow Museum of Modern Art, Moscow
 2007 – "Documenta 12", Kassel
 2007 – Ottobre. Uscita, Desiderio e Memoria, Artra, Milan
 2008 – Industrial Lies, Dispari & Dispari Project, Reggio Emilia
 2009 – History of Russian Videoart. Vol.2, Moscow Museum of Modern Art, Moscow
 2010 – Objects in Mirror Are Closer than They Appear: About videoart in Russia, Futura, Prague
 2010 — History of Russian Videoart. Vol.3, Moscow Museum of Modern Art, Moscow

References

External links
 Objects in Mirror Are Closer than They Appear
 To make your hands strong…
 Holger Büch's article about work of Kirill Preobrazhenskiy at Documenta
 Festival Territory
 From underground to foreground: the rise of video art in Russia by Antonio Geusa

1970 births
Living people
Russian contemporary artists
Russian video artists